Shakuntala Devi (1929–2013) was an Indian writer and mental calculator.

Shakuntala Devi may also refer to:
Shakuntala Devi (film) about the writer and mental calculator
Shakuntala Devi (politician) (born 1931–2022), Congress member of the Lok Sabha
Sakuntla Devi, Member of the Legislative Assembly of Uttar Pradesh for the Samajwadi Party